This is a summary of 2006 in music in the United Kingdom including the official single and album charts.

Summary
At both ends of the year, the chart was dominated by acts from series 2 and series 3 of The X Factor: former contestants Shayne Ward, Chico Slimani and Leona Lewis had number one singles, with Ward and Journey South both enjoying number-one albums.
A number of pop acts from the 1990s enjoyed comebacks, with Take That in particular having chart and touring success; Emma Bunton and All Saints also returned to the charts.
The internet had an increased impact on music. Sandi Thom and Lily Allen both had massive success off the back of initial exposure on the web, Many artists used MySpace to spread their music to the wider world Downloaded music also began to dominate the charts, with sales of legal downloads rising from less than six million in 2004 to over 50 million in 2006. When the rules changed, "Crazy" by Gnarls Barkley became the first song to top the singles chart on the basis of downloads alone. From the beginning of 2007, 'physical' copies of a song no longer need to be issued for a song to chart which raises the possibility of golden oldies entering the charts on the back of downloads alone.
The rise of the internet's influence contrasted with the end of some other long running pop media. Smash Hits magazine, the traditional live Saturday morning kids' programmes on BBC & ITV and Top of the Pops television show all ended in 2006; Top of the Pops had been broadcasting on the BBC since 1964 whilst the Saturday morning kids shows had been broadcasting on the BBC & ITV since 1968 with Smash! Hits being published since 1978.

Chronological Review
In January, X Factor winner Shayne Ward held on to the top spot in the single chart with his debut "That's My Goal" for three weeks. Ward later went on to top the charts with his debut album in April, on the back of his reality TV show success.

Meanwhile, The Strokes and HARD-Fi both got their first number one albums in January, the Strokes previously having two number twos. Arctic Monkeys were the big story, with their second single "When the Sun Goes Down" repeating the feat of their debut and reaching number one. A week later their debut album, "Whatever People Say I Am, That's What I'm Not", sold over 360,000 copies in its first week. It stayed at number one for four weeks. Arctic Monkeys were also big winners at the NME Awards, taking home three awards. They picked up Best Single for "I Bet You Look Good on the Dancefloor", Best New Band and Best Group. Other winners included Kanye West, singer Ricky Wilson and the Kaiser Chiefs who despite being nominated for six awards only came away with one for Best Album.

The 2006 BRIT Awards were dominated by 'new' acts, with the Kaiser Chiefs winning 3 awards, including 'Best Group', and James Blunt coming away with two. Other big winners were Coldplay, who had the best album and single, and Green Day.

The pop band All Saints announced that they would be reforming, five years after they had split in 2001. Another return came from Leo Sayer, who hit number one 29 years after his previous chart topper, with a remix of the single "Thunder in My Heart". Smash Hits magazine, however, left the music business after 28 years of covering pop music. Later in the year, Top of the Pops also ended, after 42 years on British television. It had been losing ratings for the past five years, having been usurped by music television. The traditional live Saturday morning children's programmes ended too, after 38 years on BBC & ITV. Again, they had been losing ratings for the past 4 years, for the same reason.

The other number ones in the start of the year went to Madonna, with her 12th chart-topper "Sorry", and to US rapper The Notorious B.I.G. in February, who climbed to number one. The song was a re-working of his debut single "Nasty Girl" (which features guest appearances from Jagged Edge, P. Diddy, Nelly, and Avery Storm). He died in 1997, but this is the first time he has scored a #1 and just under a year after "rival" rapper 2Pac had also achieved his first #1 with "Ghetto Gospel".

Chico Slimani, who had finished fifth in the X Factor, went straight to number one with "It's Chico Time", holding on to the top spot for two weeks in March. Orson climbed to the top of the singles chart successfully knocked Chico off the top spot with their song "No Tomorrow".

With a new chart rule stating that singles on downloads alone may enter the chart a week before their full release, Ne-Yo was the first act who managed to climb from #18 to #1, one week after it was released on downloads alone, with his debut single So Sick. Embrace entered to #2 that week with their new single "Nature's Law", making it their biggest single to date. However, it only failed to reach #1 due to a large count of legal downloads which didn't register in the official charts. The following week, their fifth studio album This New Day became their third album to reach #1 in the UK Albums Chart. Other acts that benefited from the change in rules included The Black Eyed Peas, Pink, Liz McClarnon, Girls Aloud, Yeah Yeah Yeahs, James Blunt, Joey Negro, Sean Paul and Nelly.  The following week, Gnarls Barkley became the first act to top the singles chart on downloads alone, with Crazy. This was the start of huge success for the duo, who went on to top the singles charts for 9 weeks, as well as the album chart for a week and also the UK Official Download Chart for an outstanding 11 weeks making it the longest stay on the UK Official Download Chart history. However, the single version of Crazy was deliberately deleted on 28 May in order to stop the single's welcome being overstayed. "Crazy" was the first single to top the UK singles chart for nine weeks consecutively since 1994 when Wet Wet Wet's "Love Is All Around" was number one for fifteen weeks (the last song to spend exactly nine weeks on top was "Two Tribes" by Frankie Goes to Hollywood in 1984). But, Crazy's nine-week run at number one came to an end when singer/songwriter Sandi Thom finally knocked it off number one with her debut single I Wish I Was a Punk Rocker (With Flowers in My Hair). 2006 also saw Morrissey return to the top of the album chart for the first time in 12 years with "Ringleader of the Tormentors".

Thom occupied the number one spot for a solitary week before being replaced by Nelly Furtado, who climbed to number one with Maneater and maintained her position the following 3 weeks. On 18 June 2006 there were five England Football World Cup songs in the top 13 in the Official UK Singles Chart. This included the official single by Embrace, a parody of the Dad's Army theme by the Tonedef Allstars and the former number 1 single Three Lions, which topped the chart in both 1996 and 1998.

The festival season was marked by the absence of Glastonbury, which was taking a 'fallow year'. Headliners at the major festivals included: The Who and Red Hot Chili Peppers at T in the Park; Coldplay and the Foo Fighters at the Isle of Wight Festival; Metallica and Guns N' Roses at Download Festival; Radiohead and Kasabian at V Festival; The Prodigy and Goldfrapp at Creamfields; Daft Punk and Groove Armada at Global Gathering 2006; The Who and The Strokes at the Wireless Festival; and Pearl Jam and Muse at the Carling Weekend. This would turn out to be the penultimate year, that the much disputed sponsorship deal by the brewery would take place, and would go on to be the start of the brewery's decline in the UK live music scene, as it suddenly lost its sponsorship deals for gig venues to LiveNation and O2

Following Nelly Furtado's 3 weeks on top for the first time, both Shakira featuring Wyclef Jean's Hips Don't Lie and Lily Allen's Smile enjoyed a first time at the top of the UK singles chart summit with Shakira's smash hit and Lily Allen's debut single. Another debut single to be released was German dance group Cascada's Everytime We Touch which went on to peak at #2, as Hips Don't Lie held them of the top spot. It ended 2006 as being the UK's fifteenth best selling single.

Pop band McFly scored their fifth UK number one single Don't Stop Me Now/Please, Please but the following week dropped to number 6 in the top 40. The week after Shakira climbed back on top with "Hips Don't Lie", the first time since 2004's single Call on Me by Eric Prydz to return to the top. July also saw first time number one albums for the Lostprophets and Razorlight.

In August, it was an American female double on top of both charts, with Christina Aguilera's Back To Basics topping the album chart, and the following week former Destiny's Child star Beyoncé Knowles scored her second (fourth, including her career with the group) number one single with Deja Vu along with her boyfriend Jay-Z.

September kicked off with another American act at #1 in both charts, this time former 'N Sync star Justin Timberlake with his comeback single Sexyback and with his second album FutureSex/LoveSounds. He had previously has three number two records and this is his first #1 single as a solo artist and as part of 'N Sync.

The following week the Scissor Sisters managed to score their first UK #1 with I Don't Feel Like Dancin' and is third highest seller (so far) of this year. They also scored their second #1 in the album chart with Ta-Dah, therefore topping both the album and singles chart at the same time (the last act to manage that was Gnarls Barkley with Crazy and St. Elsewhere).

In October, Girls Aloud became the first British act (sixth act overall) to enter the UK Top 10 on downloads alone when Something Kinda Ooooh charted at #5 on 22 October. The following week it climbed to #3, but they were beaten to number one by McFly with their sixth number one Star Girl. We also saw #1 albums from The Killers, Robbie Williams, Girls Aloud and Jamiroquai.

November saw Dutch DJ and producer Fedde Le Grand manage to get his first UK #1 with Put Your Hands Up For Detroit, while Westlife were still breaking records with their 14 number one The Rose. Westlife didn't last long at the top and later got replaced by rapstar Akon with Smack That which featured the rap music legend Eminem; this was Akon's second and Eminem's seventh number one single.

In November and early December, the charts were dominated by boy bands. Ten years since their last number one single, Take That managed to reclaim their position on top of the singles chart with Patience. Meanwhile, Westlife's number one streak continued with their sixth #1 album The Love Album beating compilation albums from Oasis, The Beatles and U2. This was then knocked off the top by Take That's album Beautiful World. These remained on top of the charts for two more weeks. During this time there were hit singles from Emma Bunton's Official Children in Need song Downtown, Chris Cornell's You Know My Name which was used in Casino Royale, Cliff Richard's 21st Century Christmas and Wind It Up from No Doubt front woman Gwen Stefani.

The X Factor was won by Leona Lewis, beating former child actor Raymond Quinn in the final. She became the first female winner of the show. Her debut single "A Moment Like This" was chosen for whoever won the competition and was released on download the day after the final, selling 50,000 copies in its first half-hour, more than most songs this year achieved in a whole week.

Record sales 
Single sales bounced back in 2006 as legal downloads added nearly thirty million sales to the total for the year. Despite this, the 17,694 copies sold during its week at number one gave Orson's "No Tomorrow" the distinction of being the lowest sales ever of a chart topper. However 2006 also saw one song achieve sales of over half a million in its first week, Leona Lewis's song "A Moment Like This" sold 571,992 copies. Although not the biggest first week sales of any of the UK television talent show winners it was still a remarkable figure when total sales of individual records were generally in decline.

As of year end, Gnarls Barkley's single "Crazy", had sold over 800,000 (plus an additional 40,000+ before it became chart eligible) to become the best selling single of 2006, while Leona Lewis had the second biggest seller of the year and enjoyed a second week at number one as 2006 became 2007. The rest of the top five best sellers saw Shakira at three with over 500,000 copies sold in what was a very long chart run, Scissor Sisters were fourth and Sandi Thom was fifth in the overall sales list.

Charts

Number-one singles

Number-one single downloads

Number-one albums

Number-one compilation albums

Number-one album downloads

Year-end charts
Between 31 December 2005 and 31 December 2006.

Best-selling singles

Best-selling albums

Best-selling compilations

Notes:

Music awards

BRIT Awards
The 2006 BRIT Awards took place on 15 February 2006, at Earl's Court in London

Best British Male Solo Artist: James Blunt
Best British Female Solo Artist: KT Tunstall
Best British Group: Kaiser Chiefs
Best British Album: Coldplay - X&Y
Best British Single: Coldplay - "Speed of Sound"
Best British Rock Act: Kaiser Chiefs
Best British Urban Act: Lemar
Best British Live Act: Kaiser Chiefs
British Breakthrough Artist: Arctic Monkeys
Best Pop Act: James Blunt
Best International Male Solo Artist: Kanye West
Best International Female Solo Artist: Madonna
Best International Group: Green Day
Best International Album: Green Day - American Idiot
International Breakthrough Artist: Jack Johnson
Outstanding Contribution to Music: Paul Weller

Mercury Music Prize
The 2006 Mercury Music Prize was awarded to Arctic Monkeys - Whatever People Say I Am, That's What I'm Not

Popjustice £20 Music Prize
The 2006 Popjustice £20 Music Prize was awarded to Girls Aloud for their song Biology  from the album Chemistry.

Record of the Year
The Record of the Year was awarded to "Patience" by Take That.

See also
 List of UK Singles Chart number ones of the 2000s
 List of UK Independent Singles Chart number ones of 2006
 List of UK Rock & Metal Singles Chart number ones of 2006

References

External links
BBC Radio 1's Chart Show

The Official Charts Company

 Top 200 singles of 2006

United Kingdom
Charts, 2006 in British Music
British record charts